Nigula Bog is a bog in Pärnu County, Estonia.

The area of the bog is 2320 ha. 

Thickness of peat layer is not more than 6.8 m.

References

Pärnu County
Bogs of Estonia